The Party of Socialists and Democrats (PSD) is a social-democratic and democratic socialist political party in San Marino. It is a member of the Socialist International, and observer member of the Party of European Socialists. It is the only Sammarinese party with a reference to the European Union in its official political symbol. Its current-day Italian counterpart is the Democratic Party.

History 
The PSD was formed in 2005 by a merger of the Sammarinese Socialist Party (PSS), the oldest political party in the country founded in 1892, and the Party of Democrats (PdD). At the party's formation it had 27 of 60 seats in the Grand and General Council, which was reduced to 20 in the 2006 general election. The PSS long governed as the junior partner in a coalition with the Sammarinese Christian Democratic Party, while PD had its origins in the Sammarinese Communist Party founded in 1921.

The merger of the two parties provoked the exit of the centrist wing of PSS, which launched the New Socialist Party and of the socialist wing of PD, which formed the Left Party and joined the Sammarinese Communist Refoundation into forming the United Left, while 2 other splinters, led by Fabio Berardi and Nadia Ottaviani, both members of the Grand and General Council, who considered the PSD to be too left-wing, split in September 2008 to form the Arengo and Freedom party. Another split in 2009 in Borgo Maggiore formed the Sammarinese Reformist Socialist Party.

In the 2006 general election PSD won 31.8% of the vote and 20 out of 60 seats and governed in coalition from 2006 to 2008 with the Popular Alliance and United Left until tensions between the latter two caused the coalition to disintegrate.

For the 2008 general election the PSD allowed the smaller Sammarinese for Freedom party run as part of its electoral list and was part of the Reforms and Freedom electoral coalition which won 25 seats out of 60 in the Grand and General Council gaining 45.78% of the national vote but failed to gain a governmental majority and as a result the Party of Socialists and Democrats which itself gained 18 seats (a few of which went to Sammarinese for Freedom) out of the 25 the coalition gained and 31.96% of the national vote, and became part of the official opposition to the government of the centre-right coalition Pact for San Marino.

After the Sammarinese political crisis of 2011, PSD entered in a new government of national unity with PDCS. For the 2012 general election, the PSD ran as part of the winning San Marino Common Good coalition led by the Sammarinese Christian Democratic Party, restoring the political formula which had run San Marino until the 1990s.

References

External links
Official website

2005 establishments in San Marino
Democratic socialist parties in Europe
Full member parties of the Socialist International
Parties related to the Party of European Socialists
Political parties established in 2005
Political parties in San Marino
Pro-European political parties in San Marino
Social democratic parties in Europe